John Skylitzes, commonly Latinized as Ioannes Scylitzes (early 1040s – after 1101), was a Byzantine historian of the late 11th century.

Life 
Very little is known about his life. The title of his work records him as a kouropalatēs and a former droungarios of the Vigla, whereby he is usually identified with a certain John Thrakesios.

His major work is the Synopsis of Histories, which covers the reigns of the Byzantine emperors from the death of Nikephoros I in 811 to the deposition of Michael VI in 1057; it continues the chronicle of Theophanes the Confessor. There is a continuation of this work, known as Scylitzes Continuatus, covering 1057 to 1079; some historians hypothesize that it was also written by Skylitzes.

The Madrid Skylitzes

The most famous manuscript of the Synopsis was produced in Sicily in the 12th century known as the Madrid Skylitzes, and is now at the Biblioteca Nacional de España in Madrid. It features 574 miniatures, while some 100 have been lost, and is the only surviving Byzantine illuminated chronicle in Greek, providing an invaluable primary source for the visualization of contemporary Byzantium.

Explanatory notes

References

General and cited sources 
 AHRB Skylitzes Colloquium, Belfast, 21–22 September 2002, Institute for Byzantine Studies, Queen's University, Belfast.
 Flusin, B. (trans.), J.-C. Cheynet (ed.), Jean Skylitzès: Empereurs de Constantinople, Ed. Lethielleux, 2004, .
 
 Kiapidou, Eirini-Sophia. Ἡ Σύνοψη Ἱστοριῶν τοῦ Ἰωάννη Σκυλίτζη καὶ οἱ πηγές της (811‐1057). Συμβολὴ στὴ βυζαντινὴ ἱστοριογραφία κατὰ τὸν ΙΑ΄ αἰώνα, Athens 2010.
 
 
 The Thurn edition supersedes the much older one by Migne. A popular edition is being prepared for Kanakis books (with parallel Modern Greek translation) and a facsimile edition of the Madrid is also available from Militos (Μίλητος) Publishers.
 Wortley, John (trans.). A Synopsis of Byzantine History, 811–1057 (by John Scylitzes, active 1081), Cambridge University Press, 2010.

External links
 Notes by Paul Stephenson 
 Biography of Basil II with notes on Scylitzes by Catherine Holmes
 Opera Omnia by Migne Patrologia Graeca with analytical indexes
 Synopsis of Histories (Σύνοψις Ἱστοριῶν)

11th-century Byzantine historians